Dominique Bilodeau (born 14 May 1979) is a Canadian javelin thrower. In 2001, she competed in the women's javelin throw at the 2001 World Championships in Athletics held in Edmonton, Alberta, Canada. She did not qualify to compete in the final.

References

External links 
 
 

Living people
1979 births
Place of birth missing (living people)
Canadian female javelin throwers
World Athletics Championships athletes for Canada
20th-century Canadian women
21st-century Canadian women